Spas-Demensk is a town and the administrative center of Spas-Demensky District in Kaluga Oblast, Russia, located on the Demena River (an arm of the Ugra)  west of Kaluga, the administrative center of the oblast. Population:

History
It was first mentioned in 1494 as the settlement Demensk. It received its present name in 1855 and was granted town status in 1917. During World War II, Spas-Demensk was occupied by the German Army from October 4, 1941 to August 13, 1943.

Administrative and municipal status
Within the framework of administrative divisions, Spas-Demensk serves as the administrative center of Spas-Demensky District, to which it is directly subordinated. As a municipal division, the town of Spas-Demensk is incorporated within Spas-Demensky Municipal District as Spas-Demensk Urban Settlement.

References

Notes

Sources

External links
German War Graves in Spas-Demensk

Cities and towns in Kaluga Oblast
Mosalsky Uyezd